Kim Min-sik (born October 29, 1985) is a South Korean football goalkeeper who plays for FC Anyang in the K League Challenge. He has previously played for the Jeonbuk Hyundai Motors, Sangju Sangmu, and Jeonnam Dragons.

References

1985 births
Living people
South Korean footballers
Association football goalkeepers
Jeonbuk Hyundai Motors players
Jeonnam Dragons players
Gimcheon Sangmu FC players
FC Anyang players
K League 1 players
K League 2 players